In computational complexity theory, the maximum satisfiability problem (MAX-SAT) is the problem of determining the maximum number of clauses, of a given Boolean formula in conjunctive normal form, that can be made true by an assignment of truth values to the variables of the formula. It is a generalization of the Boolean satisfiability problem, which asks whether there exists a truth assignment that makes all clauses true.

Example
The conjunctive normal form formula

is not satisfiable: no matter which truth values are assigned to its two variables, at least one of its four clauses will be false.
However, it is possible to assign truth values in such a way as to make three out of four clauses true; indeed, every truth assignment will do this.
Therefore, if this formula is given as an instance of the MAX-SAT problem, the solution to the problem is the number three.

Hardness
The MAX-SAT problem is NP-hard, since its solution easily leads to the solution of the boolean satisfiability problem, which is NP-complete.

It is also difficult to find an approximate solution of the problem, that satisfies a number of clauses within a guaranteed approximation ratio of the optimal solution. More precisely, the problem is APX-complete, and thus does not admit a polynomial-time approximation scheme unless P = NP.

Weighted MAX-SAT 
More generally, one can define a weighted version of MAX-SAT as follows: given a conjunctive normal form formula with non-negative weights assigned to each clause, find truth values for its variables that maximize the combined weight of the satisfied clauses. The MAX-SAT problem is an instance of weighted MAX-SAT where all weights are 1.

Approximation algorithms

1/2-approximation 

Randomly assigning each variable to be true with probability 1/2 gives an expected 2-approximation. More precisely, if each clause has at least  variables, then this yields a (1 − 2−)-approximation. This algorithm can be derandomized using the method of conditional probabilities.

(1-1/)-approximation 

MAX-SAT can also be expressed using an integer linear program (ILP). The variables  of the ILP will correspond to the variables of the formula , whereas the variables  will correspond to the clauses. The ILP is as follows: 

The above program can be relaxed to the following linear program :

The following algorithm using that relaxation is an expected (1-1/e)-approximation:
 Solve the linear program  and obtain a solution 

This algorithm can also be derandomized using the method of conditional probabilities.

3/4-approximation 

The 1/2-approximation algorithm does better when clauses are large whereas the (1-1/)-approximation  does better when clauses are small. They can be combined as follows:
 Run the (derandomized) 1/2-approximation algorithm to get a truth assignment .
 Run the (derandomized) (1-1/e)-approximation to get a truth assignment .

This is a deterministic factor (3/4)-approximation.

Example 

On the formula

where , the (1-1/)-approximation will set each variable to True with probability 1/2, and so will behave identically to the 1/2-approximation.

Solvers
Many exact solvers for MAX-SAT have been developed during recent years, and many of them were presented in the well-known conference on the boolean satisfiability problem and related problems, the SAT Conference. In 2006 the SAT Conference hosted the first MAX-SAT evaluation comparing performance of practical solvers for MAX-SAT, as it has done in the past for the pseudo-boolean satisfiability problem and the quantified boolean formula problem.
Because of its NP-hardness, large-size MAX-SAT instances cannot in general be solved exactly, and one must often resort to approximation algorithms
and heuristics

There are several solvers submitted to the last Max-SAT Evaluations:
 Branch and Bound based: Clone, MaxSatz (based on Satz), IncMaxSatz, IUT_MaxSatz, WBO, GIDSHSat.
 Satisfiability based: SAT4J, QMaxSat.
 Unsatisfiability based: msuncore, WPM1, PM2.

Special cases
MAX-SAT is one of the optimization extensions of the boolean satisfiability problem, which is the problem of determining whether the variables of a given Boolean formula can be assigned in such a way as to make the formula evaluate to TRUE. If the clauses are restricted to have at most 2 literals, as in 2-satisfiability, we get the MAX-2SAT problem. If they are restricted to at most 3 literals per clause, as in 3-satisfiability, we get the MAX-3SAT problem.

Related problems
There are many problems related to the satisfiability of conjunctive normal form Boolean formulas.

 Decision problems:
 2SAT
 3SAT
 Optimization problems, where the goal is to maximize the number of clauses satisfied:
 MAX-SAT, and the corresponded weighted version Weighted MAX-SAT
 MAX-SAT, where each clause has exactly  variables:
 MAX-2SAT
 MAX-3SAT
 MAXEkSAT
 The partial maximum satisfiability problem (PMAX-SAT) asks for the maximum number of clauses which can be satisfied by any assignment of a given subset of clauses. The rest of the clauses must be satisfied.
 The soft satisfiability problem (soft-SAT), given a set of SAT problems, asks for the maximum number of those problems which can be satisfied by any assignment.
 The minimum satisfiability problem.
 The MAX-SAT problem can be extended to the case where the variables of the constraint satisfaction problem belong to the set of reals. The problem amounts to finding the smallest q such that the q-relaxed intersection of the constraints is not empty.

See also 
 Boolean Satisfiability Problem
 Constraint satisfaction
 Satisfiability modulo theories

External links 
 http://www.satisfiability.org/
 https://web.archive.org/web/20060324162911/http://www.iiia.csic.es/~maxsat06/
 http://www.maxsat.udl.cat
 Weighted Max-2-SAT Benchmarks with Hidden Optimum Solutions
 Lecture Notes on MAX-SAT Approximation

References 

 

Logic in computer science
Combinatorial optimization
Satisfiability problems